DITTO is a company that sells software that aids eyewear companies sell their products online using virtual fitting. Originally DITTO was a retailer that sold designer prescription eyeglasses and sunglasses. The company is based in San Francisco, CA. It used virtual fitting technology to let customers try on frames from a computer. The technology measures a user’s face by homing in on pupils, ears, cheekbones, ears and other facial landmarks, and then came back with images of dozens of different pairs of glasses that might be a good fit.

History 
DITTO was founded in 2011 in Mountain View, CA by Kate Endress, Sergey Surkov, and Dmitry Kornilov. Currently the company is headquartered in San Francisco, CA with fulfillment and distribution operations in Evansville, IN.

In April 2012, the company announced that it had picked up $3 million in funding from a group of investors led by August Capital.

At the end of February 2017, DITTO sent an email to its customers explaining that its online eyewear e-commerce and eyewear distribution would be closing down. No reason was given, they still appear to sell the technology they used to use for a virtual fitting of their eyewear.

Products 
DITTO's product line included prescription and non-prescription designer eyeglasses and sunglasses.  The company carried brands such as Ray-Ban, Persol, Chloé, TAG Heuer, and Vera Wang, as well as niche fashion and boutique brands like Jason Wu, Selima Optique, Alain Mikli, Anglo American, and John Varvatos.

Patent infringement lawsuits
In May 2013, DITTO was sued by 1-800 Contacts and another company called Lennon Imaging Technology for Patent Infringement.

The Electronic Frontier Foundation claimed that 1-800 Contacts is abusing patent law by acting like a patent troll in its lawsuit against DITTO. In a blog post, the EFF accused 1-800 Contacts of “leveraging the massive expense of patent litigation to squelch the competition” and asked its followers to help DITTO by crowdsourcing prior art.

The lawsuit by Lennon Imaging Technologies was dismissed on October 7, 2013 without prejudice.

References

External links
 Official website

Companies based in San Mateo, California
Companies established in 2011
Privately held companies based in California
Companies based in Silicon Valley
Eyewear companies of the United States
Sunglasses